Johnny Cash was an American singer and songwriter.

Johnny Cash may also refer to:
 "Johnny Cash" (Tracy Byrd song), 2004
 Johnnycash machine, a promotion used by Canada Trust for their ATMs in the 1980s and 1990s with the slogan "Why walk the line?"
 "Johnny Cash", a song by Yelawolf
 "Johnny Cash" (Lenny Kravitz song)

See also 
 Johnny Cash discography, recordings by singer Johnny Cash
 The Johnny Cash Show (TV series), a television series with singer Johnny Cash
 The Johnny Cash Show (album), a 1970 album by Johnny Cash
 Walk the Line, a 2005 film about Johnny Cash